A timeline of notable events relating to the BBC World Service, the world's largest international broadcaster, which began broadcasting in 1932.

1930s 
 1932
 19 December – The Empire Service (precursor of the World Service) launches, broadcasting on shortwave from Daventry's Borough Hill.
 25 December – King George V becomes the first monarch to deliver a Christmas Day message by radio, on the Empire Service.

 1933
 No events.

1934
 No events.

1935
 No events.

 1936
 No events.

 1937
 No events.

 1938
 3 January – The BBC begins broadcasting its first foreign-language radio service, in Arabic.
 14 March Portuguese for Brasil and Spanish for Latin America begin.
 4 June – Portuguese for Europe programmes begins.
 27 September – German, French and Italian programmes begin.
 November – The Empire Service is renamed the BBC Overseas Service.

 1939
 14 May – Afrikaans language programming begins.
 4 June – Portuguese for Africa programming begins.
 5 September – Hungarian language programming begins.
 7 September – Following the outbreak of World War II, the BBC launches its BBC Polish Section.
 30 September – Greek language programming begins.
 20 November – Turkish language programming begins.
 31 December – Czech language programming begins.

1940s 
 1940
 7 February – Bulgarian language programming begins.
 12 February – Swedish language programming begins.
18 March – Finnish language programming begins.
 9 April – Danish and Norwegian programming begins. 
 11 April – Dutch language programming begins. 
 5 May – Cantonese Chinese programming begins.
 11 May – Programming in Hindi begins.
 12 May – Swedish language programming begins.
 28 July  – Dutch programme Radio Oranje launches.
 10 August – Maltese programming begins.
 2 September – Burmese programming begins.
 15 September – Romanian programming begins.
 16 September – Greek for Cyprus programming begins.
 28 September – Belgian French & Belgian Dutch programming begins.
 12 November – Albanian programming begins with the launch of the BBC Albanian service.
 1 December – Icelandic programming begins.
 28 December – Persian programming begins.

 1941
 The BBC European Service moves to Bush House in Central London.
 22 April – Slovene programming begins.
 27 April – Thai programming begins.
 2 May – Malay programming begins.
 3 May – Tamil programming begins.
 5 May – Cantonese Chinese programming begins.
 19 May – Mandarin Chinese programming begins
 11 October – Bengali programming begins with the launch of BBC Bangla.
 31 December – Slovak programming begins.

 1942
 1 March – Gujarati and Marathi programming begins.
 10 March – Sinhala programming begins.
1 October – Hokkien Chinese programming begins.
 7 October – Programming in Russian begins.
2 November– French for Canada programming begins.

 1943
 29 March – German for Austria programming begins.
 26 May – Programming in Russian ends.
 29 May – Luxembourgish programming begins.
 4 July – Programming in Japanese begins.

 1944
 27 February – BBC General Forces Programme replaces the BBC Forces Programme (also broadcast on shortwave).
 26 June – Icelandic programming ends.
 28 August – Dutch for Indonesia and French for South-East Asia programming begins. 
 3 September – Gujarati programming ends.

 1945
 1 January – Welsh for Patagonia, Argentina programming begins.
 2 April – Dutch for Indonesia programming ends.

 1946
 25 May – Dutch for Indonesia programming resumes.
 26 May – Programming in Russian resumes.
 31 December – Welsh for Patagonia, Argentina programming ends.

 1947
 No events.

 1948
 7 February – Programmes in Hokkien Chinese end.

 1949
 3 April – Urdu programming begins.
 30 October –  Hebrew and Indonesian programming begins.

1950s 
 1950
 No events.

 1951
  13 May – Dutch for Indonesia programming ends.
 3 June – Greek for Cyprus programming ends.

 1952
 6 February – Vietnamese programming begins.
 30 March – Programming in Belgian French & Belgian Dutch ends.
 30 May – Programming in Luxembourgish ends.

 1953
 No events.

 1954
 No events.

 1955
 3 April – French for South-East Asia programming ends.

 1956
 No events.

 1957
 13 March – Hausa language programming begins with the launch of BBC Hausa.
 27 July – Swahili language programming begins.
 18 July – The BBC Somali Service launches as a twice-weekly 15-minute programme.
 10 August – Danish, Dutch, Norwegian Portuguese for Europe end.
 8 September – Afrikaans programming ends
 15 September – German for Austria programming ends.

 1958
 September – The BBC Somali Service begins daily broadcasts.
 25 December – Marathi programming ends.

 1959
 The World Service launches its first sports programme. Called Saturday Special the programme runs for one hour in the summer of 1959.

1960s 
 1960
 5 March – Thai programming ends.
 20 June – French for Africa programming begins.

 1961
 4 March – Swedish programming ends.

 1962
 3 June – Programming in Thai resumes.

 1963
 No events.

 1964
 No events.

 1965
 1 May – The General Overseas Service is renamed the BBC World Service.

 1966
 The World Service’s reach in Africa is expanded with the opening of the Ascension Island relay.
 4 July – Outlook is broadcast for the first time.

 1967
 20 January – The BBC Albanian service ends.

 1968
 28 October – Hebrew programming ends.

 1969
 7 June – BBC Nepali launches as a weekly programme.

1970s 
 1970
 BBC Nepali expands to a five days a week service.

 1971
 No events.

 1972
 No events.

 1973
 No events.

 1974
 No events.

 1975
 No events.

 1976
 30 March – Sinhala programming ends.
 25 December – English for the Caribbean programming begins.

 1977
 No events.

 1978
 No events.

 1979
 Sportsworld launches.
 7 July – Science in Action launches.

1980s 
 1980
 8 May – Programming in French for Canada ends.

 1981
 15 August – Pashto programming begins.
 31 December – Programming in Italian and Maltese ends.

 1982
 September – The BBC World Service becomes available to UK listeners for the first time, albeit only in south east England.

 1983
 No events.

 1984
 No events.

 1985
 August – For the first time in its history the World service is taken off air due to strike action in protest at the British government's decision to ban a documentary featuring an interview with Martin McGuinness of Sinn Féin.

 1986
 No events.

 1987
 The BBC World Service launches BBC 648 from the Orfordness transmitting station. The service provides a tailor-made service for northern Europe featuring some French and German programming interwoven with the main output in English.

 1988
 By 1988, the World Service ie broadcast on BBC Radio 4's long wave frequency when Radio 4 is not on air. Consequently, for the first time, the World Service is available to all of the UK, airing each night between 12,45am and 5.55am.
 Newshour launches.

 1989
 1 April – The BBC launches BBC TV Europe, a subscription-based pan-European television station.

1990s 
 1990
 11 March – Programming in Sinhala resumes.

 1991
 16 January – Upon the outbreak of the Gulf War, the BBC begins a continuous news service which is broadcast in the UK on BBC Radio 4 FM frequencies and around the world on the World Service.
 2 March – Radio 4 News FM closes and programming on the World Service returns to its usual output.
 31 March – Japanese programming ends after 48 years and Malay language programming ends after 50 years.
 15 April – The BBC World Service Television news service is launched. Unlike World Service radio which is funded by direct grant from the Foreign and Commonwealth Office, WSTV is commercially funded and carries advertising, which means that it cannot be broadcast in the UK.
 29 September – Programmes in Croatian and Serbian begin.
 14 October – World Service TV launches its Asian service.
 The first broadcasts of Europe Today take place.

 1992
 1 June – BBC Ukrainian launches.
 June – The World Service launches a programming covering the Wimbledon Championships called Sportsworld at Wimbledon.
 The BBC World Service is broadcast regularly on FM in the UK for the first time when it begins to be carried overnight on BBC Local Radio.

 1993
 20 February – The BBC Albanian service is relaunched after being off air for 26 years.
 November – The World Service’s monthly listings magazine London Calling is ‘replaced’ with a 100-page colour magazine and is renamed BBC Worldwide. It is later renamed to BBC On Air.

 1994
 8 September – Kinyarwanda programming begins.
 30 November – Azerbaijani and Uzbek programming begins.

 1995
 26 January – BBC World Service Television is renamed BBC World and is launched as an international free-to-air news channel 19:00 GMT.
 31 March – French programming ends.
 1 April – Kazakh and Kyrgyz programming begins.
 27 September – The BBC begins regular Digital Audio Broadcasting, initially just from the Crystal Palace transmitting station. Consequently, the World Service becomes available to listeners across the UK on a 24/7 basis for the first time.

 1996
 6 January – Macedonian programming begins.
 9 June – A Sunday edition of Sportworld launches.

 1997
 March – The first edition of Everywoman is broadcast.
 4 November – Debut of the BBC World Service soap Westway.
 31 December – The Finnish service ends after 57 years.

 1998
 The BBC World Service overnight transmission on BBC Local Radio ends and is replaced by BBC Radio 5 Live. The World Service had been aired on Radio 4's FM frequencies overnight for some time and is also airing 24/7 on the BBC's fledgling DAB multiplex.

 1999
BBC 648, which provided French and German language content for northern Europe from the Orfordness transmitting station, ends with the closure of the BBC's German service. – the French for Europe service had closed in 1995. Consequently, all programming from this transmitter is in English only.
 The World Today is broadcast for the first time.

2000s 
 2000
 No events.

 2001
 Technology programme Go Digital launches.
 1 July – The World Service ends short wave radio transmission directed to North America and Australasia. It says that "changing listening habits" are the reason for this decisiln. A shortwave listener coalition formed to oppose the change.

 2002
 August – The first edition of World Book Club is broadcast.

 2003
 No events.

 2004
December – The final edition of the World Service's magazine BBC On Air is published.

2005
 5 October – It is announced that broadcasts in a number of European languages will end by March 2006, to finance the launch in 2007 of TV news services in Arabic and Persian.
 10 October – The BBC’s Latin American service is renamed BBC Mundo.
 October – The BBC World Service soap opera Westway comes to an end after eight years on air.
 16 December – Kazakh programming ends.
 23 December – Polish programming ends after 66 years and Slovene programming ends after 64 years.
30 December – Bulgarian programming ends after 65 years.
31 December – Hungarian and Greek programming end, both after 66 years and Slovak programmes ends after 64 years.

 2006
 13 January – Thai programming ends for a second time.
 31 January – Croatian programming ends.
 28 February – Czech programming ends.
April – The final edition of Everywoman is broadcast. Archived episodes of the programme have since been made available on the BBC website.
 October – The first edition of World Have Your Say is broadcast.

 2007
 No events.

 2008
 18 February – The World Service ends analogue short wave broadcasting in Europe.
 6 April – Discussion programme The Forum debuts.
 1 August – Romanian broadcasts end after 69 years.
 27 October – A new daily arts magazine programme The Strand is launched.

 2009
 No events.

2010s
2010
September – The BBC announces that Sportsworld at Wimbledon is to be axed as a cost-cutting measure.

2011
January – The closure of the Albanian, Macedonian, Portuguese for Africa, Serbian and English for the Caribbean services is announced. All of these services close over the next three months. This reflected the financial situation the Corporation faced following transfer of responsibility for the Service from the Foreign Office, so that it would in future have been funded from within licence fee income. 
25 March – Europe Today is broadcast for the final time after 20 years on air.
27 March – These budget cuts also result in the switching off of the Orfordness transmitting station in Suffolk, which had been transmitting the BBC World Service on 648 kHz MW to much of northern Europe since 1982. 
29 March – Technology programme Go Digital is renamed Click.
Also in 2011, the Russian, Ukrainian, Mandarin Chinese, Turkish, Vietnamese, Azeri, and Spanish for Cuba services ceased radio broadcasting, and the Hindi, Indonesian, Kyrgyz, Nepali, Swahili, Kinyarwanda and Kirundi services ceased shortwave transmissions.

2012
12 July – The BBC World Service relocates to Broadcasting House after 70 years at Bush House.
23 July – Newsday is broadcast for the first time. It replaces The World Today and Network Africa

2013
 29 March – Daily arts magazine programme The Strand ends with coverage of the arts integrated into Outlook.
1 April – 
World Briefing, the World Service’s standard 30-minute news bulletin, is cancelled and replaced by The Newsroom.
Outlook is extended and now runs for just under an hour.
 28 October – BBC OS launches. The new programme says that it "aims to open up the news process, enabling people to discover the latest on the stories that matter to them."

2014
1 April – The World Service stops being funded by the UK Government grant  and is now funded by the television licence fee and the profits of BBC Worldwide Ltd. although the Government is providing limited funding until 2020.
 10 July –  Thai programming recommences, but only on social media.

2015
 17 January – The first edition of a new cricket show Stumped, timed to coincide with the 2015 Cricket World Cup, is broadcast.

2016
 November – The BBC announces the largest expansion of foreign language programming since the 1940s.

2017
 21 August – The first of the new language services start broadcasting when transmissions in Nigerian Pidgin begin.
 18 September – Programming in Afaan Oromoo and Tigrinya begin.
 26 September – Korean programming begins.
 2 October – 
After 73 years off air, Gujarati programming resumes and after 59 years off air, Marathi programming resumes.
Programming in Punjabi and Telugu begin.

2018
 19 February – Programming in Igbo and Yoruba begins.

2019
 1 May – Technology programme Click reverts to its original name of Digital Planet.

2020s
2020
 No events.

2021
 No events.

2022
 Following the 2022 Russian invasion of Ukraine, the BBC begins broadcasting World Service English programming at shortwave frequencies 15.735 MHz and 5875 kHz for receivers in Ukraine and parts of Russia.

References

World Service